Rahul Rawail is an Indian film director and editor in Bollywood known for his films like Love Story (1981), Betaab (1983), Arjun (1985), Dacait (1987), Anjaam (1994), Arjun Pandit (1999) and the recent one Jo Bole So Nihaal (2005). He was nominated for Filmfare Award for Best Director twice. He is son of renowned film director H. S. Rawail. Rawail has launched a few of the Bollywood actors through his films like Kumar Gaurav and Vijayeta Pandit in Love Story, Sunny Deol and Amrita Singh in Betaab, Kajol in Bekhudi (1992), and Aishwarya Rai in Aur Pyaar Ho Gaya (1997).

In his book “Raj Kapoor The Master at Work”, he goes down memory lane to document his revered 'front row seat' as an assistant director to him, the immortal master of Indian cinema. The book is as told to Pranika Sharma. In English the book is published by Bloomsbury and in Hindi by Prabhat Prakashan.

Career and personal life
Rahul Rawail is son of film director Harnam Singh Rawail (often credited as H. S. Rawail) who is known for his films Mere Mehboob (1963), Sunghursh (1968), Mehboob Ki Mehndi (1971) and Laila Majnu (1976). Rawail paid tribute to his father's 1968 film Sunghursh by titling one of his films as Jeevan Ek Sanghursh (1990). Rahul's son Bharat Rawail is an upcoming director, who had assisted Yash Chopra for the film Jab Tak Hai Jaan (2012).

Rawail began his career as assistant to Raj Kapoor  and debuted as director with 1980 Bollywood film Gunehgaar starring Parveen Babi, Rishi Kapoor, Rajendra Kumar, and Asha Parekh. His first two films were not successful but his third film  Love Story (1981) starring débutante Kumar Gaurav and Vijeta Pandit was a turning point for his career. The film was a musical love story and was a commercial success. Since then, Rawail has directed seventeen films and two television series. He has often collaborated with actor Sunny Deol who worked with Rawail on six of his films, including his debut film Betaab (1983) with Amrita Singh. The film was appreciated for Rawail's "breezy treatment" of the débutantes. Rawail launched two successful actresses of Bollywood, Kajol and Aishwarya Rai Bachchan, through his films Bekhudi (1992) and Aur Pyaar Ho Gaya (1997) respectively. Both the films did not do well commercially. He was nominated for Filmfare Best Director awards for the films Betaab (1983) and Arjun (1985).

In 2010, Rawail started an acting school in collaboration with the Stella Adler Studio of Acting, New York City. In spite of famous Bollywood personalities like Sunny Deol enrolling their children to the academy, it was shut down after 2 years in 2012.
Rawail released his book "Master at Work" a biographical work written on his mentor Raj Kapoor at the 52nd International Film Festival of India in Goa 2021. He has been appointed as Jury at the Moscow International Film Festival 2023

Filmography

References

External links

 

1951 births
Indian male screenwriters
Punjabi people
People from Bandra
Living people
Hindi-language film directors
20th-century Indian film directors
21st-century Indian film directors
Film directors from Mumbai